George M. Algoe (May 26, 1898 – June 4, 1968) was a Michigan politician.

Early life
Algoe was born on May 26, 1898.

Political life
The Flint City Commission selected him as mayor for the years 1954-58.

Post-political life
Algoe died in 1968.

References

Mayors of Flint, Michigan
1898 births
1968 deaths
20th-century American politicians